Ernest Stires (December 17, 1925 – May 4, 2008) was an American composer, musician, and mentor. His jazz-based classical music has been performed both throughout the United States and abroad.

Stires was born in Alexandria, Virginia, to a family of musicians. His maternal grandparents were the mezzo-soprano Louise Homer and the American art song composer Sidney Homer, while his cousin was the composer Samuel Barber. His paternal grandparents were Bishop Ernest Milmore Stires and Sarah Stires. He was educated first at the Episcopal High School in Alexandria and then at Harvard and Dartmouth, finally graduating from Trinity College in Connecticut. After service as a U.S. Navy pilot in World War II, Stires worked as a television advertising executive, first for NBC in California and then later for CBS in Boston. Although he had begun improvising jazz on the piano while still a small child, he did not devote himself to music as a career until 1962 when he studied composition with Nicolas Slonimsky and Francis Judd Cooke.

Ernie has three children: Sarah Stires, Ernie Stires, and Elizabeth Stires, all of whom share his love of music.

He moved to Vermont in 1967 where he was an administrator for the Vermont Symphony Orchestra and the Chamber Music Conference and Composers' Forum of the East and one of the founding members of the Consortium of Vermont Composers. He also worked as a volunteer teaching basic music theory and composition to young musicians in his community. Amongst his students were Trey Anastasio, a member of the band Phish, film composer/guitarist John Kasiewicz, composer/sound-artist Rama Gottfried, and Jamie Masefield of the Jazz Mandolin Project. Stires' electric guitar concerto, Chat Rooms, was written expressly for Anastasio who premiered it in 2001 with the Vermont Youth Orchestra under Troy Peters, an event covered on national television. In 2004, his violin concerto was premiered at Carnegie Hall in New York in a performance by the Vermont Youth Orchestra with Ruotao Mao, first violinist of the Amabile Quartet, as the soloist.

Ernie Stires died in Vermont on May 4, 2008, at the age of 82.

References

Shane Handler, The Jazz Mandolin Project Does The Jungle Tango, Glide Magazine, April 6, 2003
Scott Bernstein, In Memory of Ernie Stires (1925-2008), Hidden Track on Glide Magazine, May 9, 2008.

External links
 Ernie Stires Tribute Page
Audio interview with Ernie Stires, National Public Radio, Weekend Edition Sunday, December 20, 1998

1925 births
2008 deaths
Harvard University alumni
Dartmouth College alumni
20th-century classical composers
American male classical composers
American classical composers
United States Navy pilots of World War II
20th-century American composers
20th-century American male musicians